A Snake pit is a place of horror, torture and even death in European legends and fairy tales.

Arts
 The Snake Pit, a 1948 film
 Snake Pit, a 1984 video arcade game made by Sente Games
 "Snake Pit", a short story by Connie Faddis from the collection Star Trek: The New Voyages 2
 Snakepit, a book by Ugandan author Moses Isegawa

Music
 "The Snakepit", a song by The Cure from their 1987 album Kiss Me, Kiss Me, Kiss Me
 "The Snakepit", a song by Ice from their 1990 album Bad Blood
 "Snakepit", a song by Ozric Tentacles from their 1990 album Erpland
 "Sssnakepit", a song by Enter Shikari from their album A Flash Flood of Colour

Other uses
 The Snake Pit, a catch wrestling training school run by Billy Riley in Wigan, England
 The Snake Pit, a professional wrestling talk segment on WWE programming, hosted by Jake "The Snake" Roberts
 Snake Man of La Perouse, also known as The Snake Pit, a reptile show in Sydney, Australia
 Snake Pit, a former gay bar in Greenwich Village, New York, US; see Stonewall riots
 Snakepit (game), a variant of the logic puzzle Hidato
 Snake Pit (Indianapolis Motor Speedway), the nickname for a section of the infield at the Indianapolis Motor Speedway

See also
 Slash's Snakepit, a rock band formed by guitarist Slash
 Loreal pit, the deep depression in either side of the head in crotaline snakes
 Pit viper, a subfamily of snakes